Bikash Ranjan Das is a Bangladeshi cricketer, who played in one Test match for the country in year 2000. Das was born on July 14, 1982 in Dhaka.

He converted to Islam and changed his name to Mahmudur Rahman Rana.

References

1982 births
Living people
Bangladesh Test cricketers
20th-century Bangladeshi cricketers
21st-century Bangladeshi cricketers
Dhaka Division cricketers
Barisal Division cricketers
Cricketers from Dhaka